Rory Gibbs (born 3 April 1994) is a British rower. He won the 2022 world championship title in the British men's eight.

Rowing career
Gibbs took up rowing after picking up injuries playing rugby. He was educated at Millfield School and Oxford Brookes university. He won a gold medal in the coxless four at the 2019 European Rowing Championships with Oliver Cook, Matthew Rossiter and Sholto Carnegie. The same crew then won a bronze medal at the 2019 World Rowing Championships.

In 2021, he won a second European gold medal coxless four at Varese, Italy.

References

External links

Living people
1994 births
British male rowers
World Rowing Championships medalists for Great Britain
Rowers at the 2020 Summer Olympics
Olympic rowers of Great Britain
21st-century British people
People educated at Millfield
Alumni of Oxford Brookes University